Norway has participated in the Junior Eurovision Song Contest three times and was the host of the 2004 Contest, held in the Norwegian city of Lillehammer.

Norway's best result in the contest came in 2005, when Malin Reitan came third for Norway with the song "Sommer og skolefri". In 2006, NRK decided to withdraw from the contest, along with Sweden's SVT and Denmark's DR as a protest against the excess pressure being put on the singers. Instead, the Scandinavian broadcasters revived MGP Nordic, previously held in 2002. Norway has not participated in the contest since. NRK did, however, follow Junior Eurovision in 2019 despite non-participation. Shortly after the 2021 contest, NRK revealed that technical support was sent to Paris to see how much the contest evolved, raising questions about a possible return in 2022 after a 16-year break. As of 2023, Norway has yet to make a return to the contest.

Participation overview

Commentators and spokespersons

The contests are broadcast online worldwide through the official Junior Eurovision Song Contest website junioreurovision.tv and YouTube. In 2015, the online broadcasts featured commentary in English by junioreurovision.tv editor Luke Fisher and 2011 Bulgarian Junior Eurovision Song Contest entrant Ivan Ivanov. The Norwegian broadcaster, NRK, sent their own commentators to each contest in order to provide commentary in the Norwegian language. Spokespersons were also chosen by the national broadcaster in order to announce the awarding points from Norway. The table below list the details of each commentator and spokesperson since 2003.

Hostings

See also 
Norway in the Eurovision Song Contest – Senior version of the Junior Eurovision Song Contest.
Norway in the Eurovision Young Dancers – A competition organised by the EBU for younger dancers aged between 16 and 21.
Norway in the Eurovision Young Musicians – A competition organised by the EBU for musicians aged 18 years and younger.

References

Junior Eurovision Song Contest
Countries in the Junior Eurovision Song Contest